Countess Kitchenmaid (German: Gräfin Küchenfee) is a 1918 German silent comedy film directed by Rudolf Biebrach and starring Henny Porten, Heinrich Schroth and Martin Lübbert. While her mistress is away on an adulterous adventure, a young maid takes her place to convince a visiting dignitary that she is there with the other servants impersonating aristocrats.

Cast
 Henny Porten - Gräfin Gyllenhand / Karoline Blume
 Heinrich Schroth - Graf Gyllenhand
 Martin Lübbert - Der Stürmische
 Ernst Hofmann - Der Melancholische
 Paul Biensfeldt - Fürst
 Reinhold Schünzel - Der Schüchterne
 Rudolf Biebrach (likely uncredited)

References

Bibliography
 Jung, Uli & Schatzberg, Walter. Beyond Caligari: The Films of Robert Wiene. Berghahn Books, 1999.

External links

1918 films
Films of the German Empire
German silent feature films
German comedy films
Films directed by Rudolf Biebrach
German black-and-white films
1918 comedy films
UFA GmbH films
Silent comedy films
1910s German films
1910s German-language films